Suraj (born December 31, 1977) is an Indian film director who works primarily in Tamil films. He is best known for directing action and masala films.

Career

In 1996, Suraj began working as an assistant director to Sundar C. on his comedy films Ullathai Allitha and Mettukudi. In 1997, he continued to assist Sundar C. on Arunachalam starring Rajinikanth and he was the co-director of the film Janakiraman.

Then, Suraj returned to assist Sundar C. in his films. In 2006, he made his directorial comeback through Thalai Nagaram, starring his mentor Sundar C., Jyothirmayi and Vadivelu. The following year, Suraj made his third film Marudhamalai, featured Arjun, Nila and again comedian Vadivelu. In 2009, he directed Padikathavan starring Dhanush, Tamannaah and due his busy schedule, Vadivelu has been replaced by comedian Vivek. The film was distributed by Sun Pictures. In 2011, he made Mappillai, remake of the 1989 film Mappillai. The film starring Dhanush, Hansika Motwani and Manisha Koirala. The film received mixed reviews, but the film became a hit at the box office.

After Mappillai Suraj directed Alex Pandian starring Karthi and Anushka Shetty. The film released on 11 January 2013. After Alex Pandian's failure, Suraj directed Sakalakala Vallavan starring Jayam Ravi, Anjali and Trisha. The film released on 31 July 2015. He later directed Kaththi Sandai starring Vishal.

In 2022, Suraj directed Naai Sekar Returns, to Vadivelu’s character in Thalai Nagaram (2006) in which he plays a laughably over-the-top rowdy called Naai Sekar.

Filmography

As director

As writer

References

Tamil film directors
Living people
Film directors from Tamil Nadu
1977 births
Screenwriters from Tamil Nadu
Tamil screenwriters
21st-century Indian film directors